This is a list of outdoor and indoor rock climbing areas in the North Island of New Zealand.

Northland
Apotu Road
Bald Rock
Mangaraho
Ngahere Drive
Rosvall Rockwall
Taratara
Ti Point
Tokatoka
Waipu Caves
Waipu Cove
Waro Reserve (closed)

Auckland
Auckland University
Birkenhead Leisure Center
Clip'n'Climb
Extreme Edge
Long Bay College
Mt Eden Quarry (closed)
Maungarei Springs

Waikato
Motutere / Castle Rock  (closed)
Extreme Edge Hamilton
Karangahake Gorge
Mangaotaki
Whakamaru

Wharepapa South
Bayleys Road (closed)
Bosch  (closed)
Wharepapa Rock, formerly known as CastleRock Crag - Group accommodation available
Waipari, formerly known as Froggatt Edge
Gower (closed)
Secret Valley
Sheridan Hills
Smith Rock (closed)
Waipapa

Bay of Plenty
Mt Maunganui
Tarawera Falls
The Rock House
The Wall
Waihi Beach

Taupo
Kawakawa Bay
Kinloch
The Edge
Tihoi
Whanganui Bay (closed)
Turangi Climbing Gym

Manawatu
Mangatepopo Valley
Mt Egmont
National Park
City Rock
Massey
Manawatu Gorge

Wellington
Ferg's Rock & Kayak
HangDog
Freyberg Pool Wall
Titahi Bay

Climbing areas of New Zealand
Sports venues in New Zealand